Ministry for Internal Affairs of Khakassia (Министерство внутренних дел по Республике Хакасия) is the main law enforcement organ in the Republic of Khakassia in Russia. Subordinated directly to the Russian Interior Ministry and the President of Khakassia.

History
After the formation of Autonomous Soviet Socialist Republic of Khakassia (Khakassia ASSR), the Khakassia's Internal Ministry was established, in 1991 (In 1992 the Khakassia ASSR become the Republic of Khakassia).

On July 13, 1993 the Abakan City Police Department was created, and on May 18 in the same year, the local OMON was born.

Structure

Apparatus
Information (Информационный центр)
Criminal Investigation Department (Управление уголовного розыска)
Public Order and contact with Government of Khakassia (Управление организации охраны общественного порядка и взаимодействия с органами государственной власти Республики Хакасия)
Investigations (Следственное управление)
Licensing (Центр лицензионно-разрешительной работы)
Expert-Criminal Center (Экспертно-криминалистический центр)
Police Stations (Отдел организации деятельности участковых уполномоченных полиции и подразделений по делам несовершеннолетних)
Property Security (Отдел вневедомственной охраны)
Staff (Отдел по работе с личным составом)
Public Order (Отдел организации общественного порядка на улицах и при проведении массовых мероприятий)
Operations (Оперативно-разыскная часть собственной безопасности)
Medical and Santization (Медико-санитарная часть)

Territorial Organs
Abakan City Police Department (УМВД России по г.Абакану)
 Chernogor City Police (ОМВД России по г.Черногорску)
 Askiz Region Police (ОМВД России по Аскизскому району)
 Altai Region Police (ОМВД России по Алтайскому району)
 Sayanogor Police (МО МВД России «Саяногорский»)
 Sayanogor Beisk Region Police (Отдел полиции по Бейскому району МО МВД России «Саяногорский»)
Shirinsky Beisk Region Police (Отдел полиции по Боградскому району МО МВД России «Ширинский»)
 Tashtypsky City Police (МО МВД России «Таштыпский»)
 Abaza City Police (Отдел полиции по г.Абаза МО МВД России «Таштыпский»)
 Ust-Abakan Police Department (МО МВД России «Усть-Абаканский»)
 Sorsk City Police Department (Отделение полиции по г.Сорску МО МВД России «Усть-Абаканский»)
Shirinsky Police (МО МВД России "Ширинский")
Ordzhonikidze Region Police (Отделение полиции по Орджоникидзевскому району МО МВД России «Ширинский»)

Ministers

External links
Official Website
Khakassia's Traffic Police
Abakan City Police Department

Politics of Khakassia
Khakassia
Khakassia